FileMan is a set of utilities written by George Timson in the late 1970s and early 1980s, using MUMPS, which provide a meta-data function for MUMPS applications.  The FileMan utilities allow the definition of data structures, menus and security, reports, and forms, allowing someone to set up applications without tremendous experience in the MUMPS programming language.

FileMan was designed to support the complex information storage and processing needs of hospitals.  It was based on an active data dictionary that was able to invoke the full interpretive power of the MUMPS language from within a data reference.  For example, a field called "Length of Stay" could invoke a MUMPS expression that would process the various dates, transfers, and discharges that would then be returned as if it were stored as a fixed data element.

MUMPS differs from many languages in its handling of the null string.  A large percentage of the FileMan internal data structures are null strings, in which the information is located in the name of the "nothing" being referenced.  This approach does not fit the traditional Relational Data Model.

Its first use was in the development of medical applications for the Veterans Administration, now called the Department of Veterans Affairs, a branch of the United States Government.
Since it was a work created by the US federal government, a copyright cannot be placed on the source code, making the source code in the public domain.  Because of this, it has been used for rapid development of applications across a number of organizations, including commercial products.

FileMan may be used standalone, or may be used with the VA Kernel, which provides an operating system neutral environment for applications.

External links
 Video Interview with Tom Munnecke, co-developer of FileMan

MUMPS programming language family